Stok  is a village in the administrative district of Gmina Łagów, within Świebodzin County, Lubusz Voivodeship, in western Poland.

References

Stok